The Manurewa Marlins are a rugby league club based in Manurewa, New Zealand. In 2018 the Marlins will compete in Auckland Rugby League's Sharman Cup competition.

Between 2000 and 2003 they competed in the national Bartercard Cup competition.

Notable players
Notable Former Players include Henry Fa'afili, Joe Galuvao, Greg Eastwood, Jesse Bromwich, Kenny Bromwich, Peta Hiku, Ligi Sao and Sitaleki Akauola.

Lance Hohaia and Mark Tookey also spent time at Manurewa whilst playing for the New Zealand Warriors in the NRL.

Another former NRL, Super League and Kiwi test representative who spent time at Manurewa was Richard Blackmore, who acted as a player/coach before moving to Otahuhu, where he coached the Premier team from 2006–2010.

Owen Wright
Joe Galuvao (1998-2013 New Zealand Warriors, Penrith, South Sydney, Parramatta & Manly)
Henry Fa'afili (2007-07 New Zealand Warriors & Warrington Wolves)
Greg Eastwood (2005- Brisbane Broncos & Canterbury Bulldogs)
Daniel O'Regan (2009 New Zealand Warriors)
Jesse Bromwich (2010- Melbourne Storm)
Kenny Bromwich (2013- Melbourne Storm)
Sitaleki Akauola (2013- Wests Tigers & Penrith Panthers)
Peter Hiku (2013- Manly Sea Eagles)
Ligi Sao (2013- Manly Sea Eagles)
Siliva Havili (2014- New Zealand Warriors)

Bartercard Cup
The Marlins played four season in the Bartercard cup, making the playoffs just once. They did however win in their first finals appearance, beating the Otahuhu Leopards, before going down against eventual runners up, the Eastern Tornadoes. In 2004 their place was taken by the Counties Manukau Jetz.

Manurewa Senior Team Records (2000-03 +2022)
The season record for the most senior men’s team in the club.

References

External links
 Official website
 ARL Marlins Page

 
Rugby clubs established in 1960
1960 establishments in New Zealand